Sundby is a locality in Ekerö Municipality, Stockholm County, Sweden it had 270 inhabitants in 2010.

References 

Populated places in Ekerö Municipality
Uppland
Districts in Västerort